Taufiq Qureshi (born 1962) is an Indian classical musician. He is a percussionist and a composer.

Early life
Born in Mumbai, to the tabla player, Alla Rakha. His eldest brother is a tabla player, Zakir Hussain. He received guidance from Ghatam Vidhwan, Pandit Vikku Vinayakram.

Career
Qureshi started his career, when he was still in his 20s. His stint with live performances began with the creation of his own world music band, ‘Surya’ way back in 1986-87. He has been featured as a performing artiste on the 2009 Grammy Award-winning album Global Drum Project, Remember Shakti, Masters of Percussion and Summit. He collaborates with various classical artists for fusion concerts.

A dedicated self-learner, Qureshi soon discovered his greatest asset; ‘a feel for the world of sound with all its intricate nuances’. This quality makes him one of the most sought after rhythm-programmers, arranger-composers and percussionists in the world of studio recordings (film background scores, TV serials, ad-jingles, albums, etc.).

He plays a variety of percussion instruments like djembe, duff, bongos, batajon. He is the first artiste to have developed a unique rhythmic language to adapt the tabla syllables on the African drum called Djembe.

Qureshi’s trademark style incorporates body and vocal percussions to create unique rhythmic motifs spanning across cultures.

Recently Qureshi has been honored by Sandeep Marwah with the life membership of International Film And Television Club of Asian Academy of Film & Television at Marwah Studio, Noida Film City. 
He has been teaching students for over a decade.

Awards and recognition
Gold at the Cannes film festival (2010–11) for Best Music for the Indian Railways jingle.
Gold at the London International Awards - Las Vegas (Nov 2013) for Original Music for the Nike jingle - Parallel Journey.

Bollywood
He has also been a part of background score and contributed music for movies like Damini, Train To Pakistan, Ghatak, Agnivarsha, Asoka, Mission Kashmir, Black, Dil Chahta Hai, Devdaas, Sawariya, Dhoom 2, Bhool Bhulaiya, Parzania (2007), Tere Naam (2008), Jab We Met (2010–11), Action Replay (2010–11), Housefull 2 (2011), Tez (2012), ABCD (AnyBody Can Dance) (2013), Bhaag Milkha Bhaag (2013). Fluent in Marathi, Taufiq has been a judge on Zee Marathi's Sa Re Ga Ma Pa.

Personal life
Qureshi is married to Geetika Varde, a vocalist of the Jaipur-Atrauli gharana. He has one son, Shikhar Naad Qureshi, who studied at St. Xavier's College, Mumbai. Shikhar is also a rhythm player and performs on stage as well.

Discography
 Rhydhun (2000)
 Swar Utsav - Streams In Confluence (2001)
 Rhydhun Gold (2002)
 Mondo Beat - Masters of Percussion
 India The Greatest Songs Ever
 Taalisma (2002)
 Colours of Rajasthan (1995)
 PercJam (2003)
 Bombay Fever (2006)
 Mystic Soundscapes - Forest (2007)
 Rooh - Songs From The Heart (2007)
 TaDhaa- An Expression Of High Energy (2011)
 The Oath Of Vaayuputras (2013)
 Aami [2018]  Malayalam film

References

External links
 Official site
 

1962 births
Living people
Hindustani instrumentalists
Carnatic instrumentalists
Indian percussionists
Indian male composers
Tabla players
Indian Muslims
Musicians from Mumbai
Indian classical composers
Indian male classical musicians